The following lists events in the year 2022 in Panama.

Incumbents 

 President: Laurentino Cortizo
 Vice President: José Gabriel Carrizo

Events 
Ongoing — COVID-19 pandemic in Panama

 17 February – Panama-flagged car carrier MV Felicity Ace is abandoned approximately 90 nautical miles southwest of the Azores following a severe fire on board. The ship's entire 22-man crew safely evacuates using lifeboats.
 17 March – Panama's maritime authority states that Russia has attacked three Panamanian-flagged civil vessels in the Black Sea since the Russian invasion of Ukraine began on February 24, causing one of the ships to sink. No deaths have been reported.
 20 April – The United States signs an agreement with Panama to help stop undocumented immigration.
 5 July – Panama confirms its first case of monkeypox.
 12 July – Protesters in Panama continue blocking streets and railways, mainly in Chiriquí and Veraguas Provinces, rejecting the concession by president Laurentino Cortizo of freezing fuel prices. 
 16 July – Protests continue in Panama with road and railways blockades, after protesters rejected president Laurentino Cortizo's concessions.

Deaths 

 7 January – Ruby Moscoso de Young, 80, Panamanian politician, first lady (1999–2004)
 2 February – Robert Blalack, 73, visual effects artist (Star Wars, RoboCop, The Day After), Oscar winner (1978)
 3 February – Felipe Virzi, 79, politician and businessman, second vice president (1994–1999)
 29 August – Rigoberto Riasco, 69, boxer, WBC super bantamweight champion (1976).
 18 September – Carmen A. Miró, 103, sociologist, statistician, and demographer.

See also

References 

 
2020s in Panama
Years of the 21st century in Panama
Panama
Panama